Passo de Camaragibe is a municipality located in the northern coast of the Brazilian state of Alagoas. Its population is 15,258 (2020) and its area is 187 km².

References

Populated coastal places in Alagoas
Municipalities in Alagoas